Bushmeat is meat from wildlife species that are hunted for human consumption, most often referring to the meat of game in Africa. Bushmeat represents
a primary source of animal protein and a cash-earning commodity for inhabitants of humid tropical forest regions in Africa, Latin America and Asia.
Bushmeat is an important food resource for poor people, particularly in rural areas.

The numbers of animals killed and traded as bushmeat in the 1990s in West and Central Africa were thought to be unsustainable.
By 2005, commercial harvesting and trading of bushmeat was considered a threat to biodiversity. As of 2016, 301 terrestrial mammals were threatened with extinction due to hunting for bushmeat including primates, even-toed ungulates, bats, diprotodont marsupials, rodents and carnivores occurring in developing countries.

Bushmeat provides increased opportunity for transmission of several zoonotic viruses from animal hosts to humans, such as Ebolavirus and HIV.

Nomenclature 
The term 'bushmeat' is originally an African term for wildlife species that are hunted for human consumption, and usually refers specifically to the meat of African wildlife.
In October 2000, the IUCN World Conservation Congress passed a resolution on the unsustainable commercial trade in wild meat. Affected countries were urged to recognize the increasing impact of the bushmeat trade, to strengthen and enforce legislation, and to develop action programmes to mitigate the impact of the trade. Donor organisations were requested to provide funding for the implementation of such programmes.

Wildlife hunting for food is important for the livelihood security of and supply of dietary protein for poor people. It can be sustainable when carried out by traditional hunter-gatherers in large landscapes for their own consumption. Due to the extent of bushmeat hunting for trade in markets, the survival of those species that are large-bodied and reproduce slowly is threatened. The term bushmeat crisis was coined in 2007 and refers to this dual threat of depleting food resources and wildlife extinctions, both entailed by the bushmeat trade.

Affected wildlife species 
Globally, more than 1,000 animal species are estimated to be affected by hunting for bushmeat.
Bushmeat hunters use mostly leg-hold snare traps to catch any wildlife, but prefer to kill large species, as these provide a greater amount of meat than small species.

In 2002, it was estimated that species weighing more than  contribute  of meat per year to the bushmeat extracted in the Congo Basin, based on 24 individuals.

The 301 mammal species threatened by hunting for bushmeat comprise 126 primates, 65 even-toed ungulates, 27 bats, 26 diprotodont marsupials, 21 rodents, 12 carnivores and all pangolin species.

Primate species offered fresh and smoked in 2009 at a wildlife market by Liberia's Cavally River included chimpanzee (Pan troglodytes), Diana monkey (Cercopithecus diana), putty-nosed monkey (C. nictitans), lesser spot-nosed monkey (C. petaurista), Campbell's mona monkey (C. campbelli), sooty mangabey (Cercocebus atys), king colobus (Colobus polykomos), olive colobus (Procolobus verus), western red colobus (P. badius). Duiker species constituted more than half of the total 723 animals offered.
In 2012, the bushmeat trade was surveyed in three villages in the Sassandra Department, Ivory Coast. During six months, nine restaurants received 376 mammals and eight reptiles, including dwarf crocodile (Osteolaemus tetraspis), harnessed bushbuck (Tragelaphus scriptus), Maxwell's duiker (Philantomba maxwellii), bay duiker (Cephalophus dorsalis), Campbell's mona monkey, lesser spot-nosed monkey, potto (Perodicticus potto), tree pangolin (Phataginus tricuspis), long-tailed pangolin (P. tetradactyla), African brush-tailed porcupine (Atherurus africanus), giant pouched rat (Cricetomys gambianus), greater cane rat (Thryonomys swinderianus), striped ground squirrel (Xerus erythropus) and western tree hyrax (Dendrohyrax dorsalis).
About 128,400 straw-coloured fruit bats (Eidolon helvum) were estimated in 2011 to be traded as bushmeat every year in four cities in southern Ghana.

In 2006, it was estimated that about 1,437,458 animals are killed every year in the Nigerian and Cameroon parts of the Cross-Sanaga-Bioko coastal forests, including about 43,880 Emin's pouched rats (Cricetomys emini), 41,800 tree pangolins, 39,700 putty-nosed monkeys, 22,500 Mona monkeys (Cercopithecus mona), 3,500 red-eared guenons (C. erythrotis), 20,300 drills (Mandrillus leucophaeus), 15,300 African civets (Civettictis civetta), 11,900 common kusimanses (Crossarchus obscurus), more than 7,600 African palm civets (Nandinia binotata), 26,760 Nile monitors (Varanus niloticus) and 410 African forest elephants (Loxodonta cyclotis).

Between 1983 and 2002, the Gabon populations of western gorilla (Gorilla gorilla) and common  chimpanzee (Pan troglodytes) were estimated to have declined by 56%. This decline was primarily caused by the commercial hunting, which was facilitated by the extended infrastructure for logging purposes.
Marsh mongoose (Atilax paludinosus) and long-nosed mongoose (Herpestes naso) are the most numerous small carnivores offered in rural bushmeat markets in the country.

In the late 1990s, fresh and smoked bonobo (Pan paniscus) carcasses were observed in Basankusu in the Province of Équateur in the Congo Basin.
The main species killed by bushmeat hunters in Tanzania's Katavi-Rukwa Region include impala (Aepyceros melampus), common duiker (Sylvicapra grimmia), warthog (Phacocherus africanus), Cape buffalo (Syncerus caffer), harnessed bushbuck, red river hog (Potamochoerus porcus) and plains zebra (Equus quagga).

A survey in a rural area in southwestern Madagascar revealed that bushmeat hunters target bushpig (Potamochoerus larvatus), ring-tailed lemur (Lemur catta), Verreaux's sifaka (Propithecus verreauxi), Hubbard's sportive lemur (Lepilemur hubbardorum), fat-tailed dwarf lemur (Cheirogaleus medius), common tenrec (Tenrec ecaudatus), grey mouse lemur (Microcebus murinus), reddish-gray mouse lemur (M. griseorufus), Madagascan fruit bat (Eidolon dupreanum) and Madagascan flying fox (Pteropus rufus).

Dynamics

Logging 
Logging concessions operated by companies in African forests have been closely linked to the bushmeat trade. Because they provide roads, trucks and other access to remote forests, they are the primary means for the transportation of hunters and meat between forests and urban centres. Some, including the Congolaise Industrielle du Bois (CIB) in the Republic of Congo, partnered with governments and international conservation organizations to regulate the bushmeat trade within the concessions where they operate. Numerous solutions are needed; because each country has different circumstances, traditions and laws, no one solution will work in every location.

Nutrition
Bushmeat can be an important source of micronutrients and macronutrients. A study of South Americans in the Tres Fronteras region found that those who consumed bushmeat were at a lower risk of anemia and chronic health conditions, as their diets included more iron, zinc, and vitamin C than those who did not eat bushmeat.

Overfishing 
In Ghana, international illegal over-exploitation of African fishing grounds has increased demand for bushmeat. Both European Union-subsidized fleets and local commercial fleets have depleted fish stocks, leaving local people to supplement their diets with animals hunted from nature reserves. Over 30 years of data link sharp declines in both mammal populations and the biomass of 41 wildlife species with a decreased supply of fish.
Consumption of fish and of bushmeat is correlated: the decline of one resource drives up the demand and price for the other.

Pastoralism 
Transhumant pastoralists from the border area between Sudan and the Central African Republic are accompanied by armed merchants who also engage in poaching large herbivores. The decline of giant eland, Cape buffalo, hartebeest and waterbuck in the Chinko area between 2012 and 2017 is attributed to their poaching activities. They use livestock to transport bushmeat to markets.

Role in spread of diseases 

Animal sources may have been the cause for infectious diseases such as tuberculosis, leprosy, cholera, smallpox, measles, influenza, and syphilis acquired by early agrarians. The emergence of HIV-1, AIDS, Ebola virus disease, and Creutzfeldt-Jakob disease are attributed to animal sources today.
Thomas's rope squirrel (Funisciurus anerythrus) and red-legged sun squirrel (Heliosciurus rufobrachium) were identified as reservoirs of the monkeypox virus in the Democratic Republic of the Congo in the 1980s.

Outbreaks of the Ebola virus in the Congo Basin and in Gabon in the 1990s have been associated with the butchering and consumption of chimpanzees and bonobos. Bushmeat hunters in Central Africa infected with the human T-lymphotropic virus were closely exposed to wild primates.
Anthrax can be transmitted when butchering and eating ungulates. The risk of bloodborne diseases to be transmitted is higher when butchering a carcass than when transporting, cooking and eating it.

Many hunters and traders are not aware of zoonosis and the risks of disease transmissions.
An interview survey in rural communities in Nigeria revealed that 55% of the respondents knew of zoonoses, but their education and cultural traditions are important drivers for hunting and eating bushmeat despite the risks involved.

HIV 
Results of research on wild chimpanzees in Cameroon indicate that they are naturally infected with the simian foamy virus and constitute a reservoir of HIV-1, a precursor of the acquired immunodeficiency syndrome (AIDS) in humans. There are several distinct strains of HIV, indicating that this cross-species transfer has occurred several times. Simian immunodeficiency virus present in chimpanzees is reportedly derived from older strains of the virus present in the collared mangabey (Cercocebus torquatus) and the putty-nosed monkey. It is likely that HIV was initially transferred to humans after having come into contact with infected bushmeat.

Ebola 
The natural reservoirs of ebolaviruses are unknown. Possible reservoirs include non-human primates, megabats, rodents, shrews, carnivores, and ungulates.
Between October 2001 and December 2003, five Ebola virus outbreaks occurred in the border area between Gabon and Republic of Congo. Autopsies of wildlife carcasses showed that chimpanzees, gorillas and bay duikers were infected with the virus.
The Ebola virus has been linked to bushmeat, with some researchers hypothesizing that megabats are a primary host of at least some variants of Ebola virus. Between the first recorded outbreak in 1976 and the largest in 2014, the virus has transferred from animals to humans only 30 times, despite large numbers of bats being killed and sold each year. Bats drop partially eaten fruits and pulp, then terrestrial mammals such as gorillas and duikers feed on these fruits. This chain of events forms a possible indirect means of transmission from the natural host to animal populations.
The suspected index case for the Ebola virus epidemic in West Africa in 2014 was a two-year-old boy in Meliandou in south-eastern Guinea, who played in a hollow tree harbouring a colony of Angolan free-tailed bats (Mops condylurus).

Results of a study conducted during the Ebola crisis in Liberia showed that socio-economic conditions impacted bushmeat consumption. During the crisis, there was a decrease in bushmeat consumption and daily meal frequency. In addition, preferences for bushmeat species stayed the same.

Parasites
In Cameroon, 15 primate species were examined for gastrointestinal parasites. Bushmeat primates were infected with Trichuris, Entamoeba, Ascaris, Capillaria, pinworms, Bertiella and Endolimax nana.
A large proportion of Bitis vipers sold at rural bushmeat markets in the Democratic Republic of the Congo are infected by Armillifer grandis, which represent a threat to public health.

Management
Suggestions for reducing or halting bushmeat harvest and trade include:
increase access of consumers to affordable and reliable alternative sources of animal protein such as chicken, small livestock and farmed fish raised at family level;
devolve rights and authority over wildlife to local communities;
strengthen the management of protected areas and enforce wildlife conservation laws.

As an alternative to bushmeat, captive breeding of species traditionally harvested from the wild is sometimes feasible. Captive breeding efforts must be closely monitored, as there is risk they can be used to launder and legitimize individuals captured from the wild, similar to the laundering of wild green tree pythons in Indonesia for the pet trade.

See also 
 Cat meat
 Dog meat
 Game – animals hunted for food
 Indigenous cuisine of the Americas
 Malnutrition
 Roadkill cuisine
 Wildlife trafficking and emerging zoonotic diseases
 Yewei – wildlife meat sold at Chinese wet markets

References

External links 

Meat
Environmental issues with forests
Environmental crime